Tino Casali (born 14 November 1995) is an Austrian professional footballer who plays as a goalkeeper for Rheindorf Altach. He has represented Austria at youth level.

Club career

Early years
Casali began his footballing career with SV Spittal/Drau. In 2009, he joined the regional team of AKA Carinthia, where he progressed through all youth teams. In April 2013, he made his senior debut for Spittal/Drau in the Landesliga. This remained his only appearance for Spittal in the fourth highest league.

Austria Wien
On 5 March 2013, Casali joined the youth academy of Austria Wien, signing a two-year deal. In October 2013 he played his first and only game for the U19 team in the UEFA Youth League against Atlético Madrid. In February 2014, he was part of the first-team squad for the league match against Rapid Wien, without having previously played for the reserves. In March 2014, he finally made his debut for Austria Wien II against the reserves of SV Mattersburg in the Austrian Regionalliga, conceding five goals in a 5–0 loss. By the end of the season, he had made 11 appearances in the Regionalliga. Ahead of the 2014–15 season, he was definitively promoted to the first team. In that season he also made 11 appearances for the reserves.

On 6 July 2015, Casali joined Floridsdorfer AC on a season-long loan as part of a cooperation agreement with Austria Wien. He made his Austrian Football First League debut for the club on 24 July 2015 in a game against LASK. After eight second division games for Floridsdorf, he returned to Austria Wien prematurely in October 2015 after regular goalkeeper Robert Almer was injured. However, he did not play for the team and only made another appearance for the reserves in the Regionalliga. In the 2016–17 season, he only made six Regionalliga appearances.

SV Mattersburg
On 22 July 2017, Casali signed a two-year contract with SV Mattersburg after having failed at making his breakthrough with Austria Wien. In the 2017–18 season, he did not make an appearance for the club from Burgenland and only played one game for the reserves in the Landesliga Burgenland, with whom he was promoted to the Regionalliga at the end of the season. 

In April 2019, he finally made his debut in the Austrian Football Bundesliga when he was in the starting lineup on matchday 25 of the 2018–19 season against Rapid Wien. In his second season at the club, Casali made five total Bundesliga appearances. In the 2019–20 season, he played four games in the top division, and he also made another appearance for the reserves in the Regionalliga.

Rheindorf Altach
On 10 July 2020, Casali joined Rheindorf Altach. He made his debut for the club on 16 September in a 3–1 victory against Union Gurten in the Austrian Cup. His league debut followed three days later in a game against Red Bull Salzburg. Mainly a backup to club legend Martin Kobras in his first season with the club, Casali became the starter for the first time in his career ahead of the 2021–22 season.

References

External links
 

1995 births
Sportspeople from Villach
Footballers from Carinthia (state)
Living people
Austrian footballers
Association football goalkeepers
Austria youth international footballers
FK Austria Wien players
Floridsdorfer AC players
SV Mattersburg players
SC Rheindorf Altach players
Austrian Football Bundesliga players
2. Liga (Austria) players
Austrian people of Italian descent